Temps mort (literally "Time out") is the debut album by French rapper Booba. For the song "Nouvelle école" exists also a remix which features American rap duo Mobb Deep.

Track listing

Samples 
"Indépendants" contains a sample of "Hunting in Packs" by Trevor Rabin.
"Écoute bien" contains a sample of "Yumeji's Theme" by Michael Galasso.
"Jusqu'ici tout va bien" contains a sample of "The Inner Child" by Mike Oldfield.
"Repose en paix" contains a sample of "Eleanor Rigby" by Vanilla Fudge, original by The Beatles.
"Le bitume avec une plume" contains a sample of "Mistral gagnant" by Renaud.
"Strass et paillettes" contains a sample of "Children of the Sun" by Mandrill.

Charts

Certifications

External links 
 
 Blog
 MySpace
 Booba on Dailymotion

2002 debut albums
Booba albums